Masters M65 discus world record progression is the progression of world record improvements of the discus M65 division of Masters athletics.  Records must be set in properly conducted, official competitions under the standing IAAF rules unless modified by World Masters Athletics.

The M65 division consists of male athletes who have reached the age of 65 but have not yet reached the age of 70, so exactly from their 65th birthday to the day before their 70th birthday. The M65 division throws a 1 kg implement.

Key

References

Masters Athletics Discus list

Masters athletics world record progressions
Discus